Hemopsis angustalis is a moth in the family Crambidae. It was described by Snellen in 1890. It is found in India.

References

Moths described in 1890
Spilomelinae